cAMP responsive element modulator is a protein that in humans is encoded by the CREM gene, and it belongs to the cAMP-responsive element binding protein family. It has multiple isoforms, which act either as repressors or activators. CREB family is important for in regulating transcription in response to various stresses, metabolic and developmental signals. CREM transcription factors also play an important role in many physiological systems, such as cardiac function, circadian rhythms, locomotion and spermatogenesis.

Function 

This gene encodes a bZIP transcription factor that binds to the cAMP responsive element found in many viral and cellular promoters. It is an important component of cAMP-mediated signal transduction during the spermatogenetic cycle, as well as other complex processes. Alternative promoter and translation initiation site usage allows this gene to exert spatial and temporal specificity to cAMP responsiveness. Multiple alternatively spliced transcript variants encoding several different isoforms have been found for this gene, with some of them functioning as activators and some as repressors of transcription.

Gene location 
The chromosomal location of CREM gene is at 10p11.21, where it starts at 35415769 and ends at 35501886 bp from pter ( according to hg19-Feb_2009)

Interactions 

CAMP responsive element modulator has been shown to interact with FHL5.

Disease relevance of CREM

Panic disorder 
One study reported the DNA sequence variations in the gene for CREM in panic disorder patients. It showed a significant excess of the shorter eight-repeat allele and of genotypes containing the eight-repeat allele in panic disorder patients. The observed associations were limited to panic disorder without agoraphobia, and they were more prominent in females. But, the independent Italian and Spanish samples in this study did not support their results. Another family-based study showed little evidence of any susceptibility locus for panic disorder either within the CREM gene or in a nearby region on chromosome 10p11

Spermiogenesis deficiency  
CREM has been shown to be a master-switch regulator in testis. It plays an important role in the regulation of the expression of post-meiotic genes, and this has been supported by several studies using CREM-mutation mice. The results showed the first step in the process of sperm formation would be blocked if the germ cell development in mice CREM gene were disrupted. The cAMP response element sites can be found in the promoter region of some postmeiotic genes, so that the CREM can target and regulate these genes.

Two studies proved that treat the rats with Salvia hypoleuca and Alpina galanga can significantly increased the CREM gene expression.

Systemic lupus erythematousus 
Less IL-2 will be produced from T cells in humans or mice with systemic lupus erythematousus (SLE). Some studies showed that an increased level CREM was presented in the nucleus of T lymphocytes from SLE patients. The CREM bound to the -180 site of the IL-2 promoter to repress its transcription.

References

Further reading

External links 
 
 

Transcription factors